The Walker House is a historic house on South Knerr Drive in Fayetteville, Arkansas.  The oldest portion of this two-story brick T-shaped house was built in 1872 by David Walker, a prominent local lawyer, judge, politician, and landowner.  Its main facade is covered by a two-story porch with ornamental carved brackets.  The rear extension was added in 1878.  The house has been in the hands of Knerr family descendants since 1910.

The house was listed on the National Register of Historic Places in 1975.

See also
National Register of Historic Places listings in Washington County, Arkansas

References

Houses on the National Register of Historic Places in Arkansas
Georgian architecture in Arkansas
Houses completed in 1872
Houses in Fayetteville, Arkansas
National Register of Historic Places in Fayetteville, Arkansas